Huckle may refer to:

 Huckle (surname)
 Mount Huckle, a mainly ice-covered mountain
 Thomas Huckle Weller (born 1915), American virologist
 Huckle Cat a children's fictional character from Richard Scarry Books.
People with the surname Huckle: